Saint-Laurent is a commune in the Côtes-d'Armor department of the region of Brittany in northwestern France.

Population
Inhabitants of Saint-Laurent are called saint-laurentais in French.

See also
 Communes of the Côtes-d'Armor department

References

External links

Communes of Côtes-d'Armor